Cordelia is an unincorporated community in Solano County, California, United States.

History

Cordelia was founded in 1853 by clipper ship captain Robert H. Waterman, and the community was initially named "Bridgeport", named after the town Bridgeport in Connecticut. Around 1869, a post office was established, and the United States Post Office Department declared that a more unique name for the town should be chosen. Waterman then named the town "Cordelia", after the first name of his wife.

In 1880, the Wells Fargo agency was established in Cordelia.

See also
 Cordelia Slough – a 10.8-mile-long (17.4 km) tidal watercourse which discharges to the Suisun Slough, which in turn empties into Grizzly Bay in Solano County, California

References

Unincorporated communities in California
Unincorporated communities in Solano County, California